Alvan Cullom (September 4, 1797 – July 20, 1877) was an American politician that represented Tennessee's 4th district in the United States House of Representatives.

Biography
Cullom was born in Monticello, Kentucky, on September 4, 1797. He received a liberal schooling, studied law, was admitted to the bar in 1823, and commenced practice in Monroe, Overton County, Tennessee. He married Susan Jones and they had seven children.

Career
Cullom was a member of the Tennessee House of Representatives in 1835 and 1836. He was elected as a Democrat to the 28th and 29th Congresses. He served from March 4, 1843, until March 3, 1847.

After resuming the practice of law, Cullom served as the circuit judge of the fourth judicial circuit of Tennessee from 1850 to 1852. He was a member of the peace convention in 1861 held in Washington, D.C., in an effort to prevent the impending war. He was the brother of William Cullom and uncle of Shelby Moore Cullom.

Death
Cullom died in Livingston, Tennessee, on July 20, 1877 (age 79 years, 319 days). He is interred in Bethlehem Cemetery near Livingston.

References

External links

Democratic Party members of the Tennessee House of Representatives
1797 births
1877 deaths
Democratic Party members of the United States House of Representatives from Tennessee
19th-century American politicians
People from Monticello, Kentucky
People from Overton County, Tennessee